The Glasflügel 206 Hornet is a Standard Class sailplane produced in Germany between 1975 and 1979. Of conventional sailplane design with a T-tail, it replaced the Standard Libelle, featuring composite construction throughout. Differences from the earlier aircraft included a redesigned canopy, retractable monowheel landing gear, and provision for 100 kg (220 lbs) of water ballast.

An improved version, the Hornet C was produced in 1979, incorporating a new one-piece canopy originally designed for the Mosquito and an increase in water ballast capacity to 170 kg (375 lb). The wing was also revised, making extensive use of carbon fibre structures to save weight.

Specifications (206)

See also

References

External links
 Glasflugel H-206 “Hornet” Retrieved 8 July 2020

1970s German sailplanes
Glasflügel aircraft
T-tail aircraft
Aircraft first flown in 1974